is a Japanese footballer. Primarily a left back, she currently plays for Omiya Ardija Ventus in the WE League and has over 100 caps for the Japan national team.

Club career
Sameshima was born in Utsunomiya on 16 June 1987. She played youth football for Kawachi SC Juvenile between 1995 and 2002 and Tokiwagi Gakuen High School from 2003 until 2005. In 2006, she joined TEPCO Mareeze, the club owned by the Tokyo Electric Power Company. During her time at Mareeze she lived in the J-Village Sports complex in Hirono near Fukushima, and like other players, she worked at the TEPCO-run Fukushima Daiichi Nuclear Power Plant to earn a living whilst playing for the club.

Following the 2011 Tōhoku earthquake and tsunami and subsequent nuclear disaster, during which the team were in a training camp in the south of the country, the club pulled out of the L.League for the remainder of the season. Sameshima then began training with the Boston Breakers in March 2011, before signing for the club permanently, the first former Mareeze player to sign for another club. She made her debut for the Breakers against Sky Blue on 12 June as a second-half substitute for Alex Scott, becoming the first Japanese international to play for the club.

On 19 September 2011, Sameshima joined French club Montpellier, joining compatriot Rumi Utsugi at the club. She returned to Japan to play for Vegalta Sendai in 2012, before joining Houston Dash in January 2014. However, due to injuries she failed to contract, and rejoined Vegalta Sendai in July 2014. She subsequently signed for INAC Kobe Leonessa for the 2015 season.

National team career
After playing for the Japanese team at the AFC U-19 Championship in 2006, Sameshima made her full international debut on 10 March 2008, against Russia, and played in the 2008 Asian Cup that year, scoring the first goal in an 11–0 win over Chinese Taipei. In 2010, she played in the 2010 Asian Games, winning a gold medal as Japan won the tournament. In 2011, she was part of the Japan squad for the 2011 World Cup, playing in every match for the World Cup Champion Japanese team. She was part of the Japanese team that won the silver medal at the 2012 Summer Olympics. She also played in the 2015 World Cup and Japan won 2nd place. In 2018, she played at 2018 Asian Cup and won the championship. She played 103 games and scored 5 goals for Japan.

Club statistics

National team statistics

National team goals

Honors
FIFA Women's World Cup
Winner, 2011
Football at the Asian Games
Gold Medal, 2010
East Asian Football Championship
Winner, 2010

See also
 List of women's footballers with 100 or more caps

References

External links

Japan Football Association

1987 births
Living people
Association football people from Tochigi Prefecture
Japanese women's footballers
Japan women's international footballers
Nadeshiko League players
Women's Professional Soccer players
TEPCO Mareeze players
Boston Breakers players
Montpellier HSC (women) players
Mynavi Vegalta Sendai Ladies players
INAC Kobe Leonessa players
Expatriate women's soccer players in the United States
Japanese expatriate sportspeople in the United States
Expatriate women's footballers in France
FIFA Women's World Cup-winning players
2011 FIFA Women's World Cup players
2015 FIFA Women's World Cup players
Olympic footballers of Japan
Olympic silver medalists for Japan
Olympic medalists in football
Medalists at the 2012 Summer Olympics
Footballers at the 2012 Summer Olympics
Asian Games medalists in football
Asian Games gold medalists for Japan
Footballers at the 2010 Asian Games
Medalists at the 2010 Asian Games
Women's association football fullbacks
People from Utsunomiya, Tochigi
Division 1 Féminine players
Footballers at the 2018 Asian Games
Medalists at the 2018 Asian Games
FIFA Century Club
2019 FIFA Women's World Cup players
Omiya Ardija Ventus players